Snehada Kadalalli is a 1992 Indian Kannada-language romance film directed by Joe Simon and produced by GVK Productions. The film stars Arjun Sarja, Malashri and Sunil. The film's title is adapted from a song from the film Shubhamangala (1975). The film was dubbed in Tamil as Meenavan.

The film's music was composed by Raj–Koti and the audio was launched on the Lahari Music banner.

Plot
Ganga, a woman from a family of fishermen, is about to marry a man from their own community. However, their wedding comes under threat when she falls in love with Raja, the son of a business tycoon.

Cast 

Arjun Sarja
Malashri 
Sunil
Rockline Venkatesh
G. K. Govinda Rao
Girija Lokesh
Rekha Das
Joe Simon
Shani Mahadevappa

Soundtrack 
The music of the film was composed by Raj–Koti with lyrics by Prof.Doddarange Gowda.

References 

1992 films
1990s Kannada-language films
Indian romance films
Films scored by Raj–Koti
1990s romance films